You Know I'm Not Going Anywhere is the fourth studio album by American band The Districts. It was released on March 13, 2020 under Fat Possum Records.

Critical reception
You Know I'm Not Going Anywhere was met with generally favorable reviews from critics. At Metacritic, which assigns a weighted average rating out of 100 to reviews from mainstream publications, this release received an average score of 74, based on 10 reviews.

Track listing

References

2020 albums
The Districts albums
Fat Possum Records albums